Hotel Sevilla is a historic hotel in Algeciras, Spain. Its construction took place between 1922 and 1925 by the Madrid-based architect Emilio Antón. It is built in the  neo-baroque style, with four floors. The balconies and balusters contain decorative floral motifs.

Today the building is home to the  González-Gaggero family and is protected as a remarkable architectural monument under Grade II of the Plan General de Ordenación Urbana (General Urban Plan of Algeciras).

References

Hotels in Algeciras
Hotels established in 1925
Hotel Sevilla
Hotel buildings completed in 1925
Spanish companies established in 1925